Samse is a village in the southern state of Karnataka, India.  It is located in the Kalasa taluk of Chikkamagaluru district in Karnataka.

Demographics
As of 2001 India census, Samse had a population of 5687 with 2933 males and 2754 females.

See also
 Chikmagalur
 Mangalore
 Districts of Karnataka

References

External links
 http://Chikmagalur.nic.in/

Villages in Chikkamagaluru district